This is a list of all military weapons ever used by German Land Forces throughout history. This list will be organized by era.

World War II 
 List of German military equipment of World War II

Cold War 
 List of weapons of West Germany

See also 
 List of modern equipment of the German Army

References

Military weapons of Germany
Weapons